Juan Carlos Etxegoien Juanarena (born 27 November 1956) is a Navarrese teacher and writer in the Basque language. He is better known as Xamar, a derivation of the name of the Xamarrena house, where he was born.

Life
Xamar was born at the house Xamarrena in the village of Garralda, Navarre. Xamarrena means in Basque "house of Xamar". He studied education and worked mainly as a teacher at an ikastola. He also contributed to the creation of the association Zenbat Gara in Bilbao, devoted to promotion of Basque language in the capital of Biscay. He is a member of the cultural foundation Euskokultur.

He has written several books on the history of Basque and has also published new theories on the problem of languages, especially the ecolinguistic approaches of José María Sánchez Carrión Txepetx, who in 1987 published a book of major relevance according to Xamar, A future for our past: Keys to the recovery of Euskara and social theory of languages.

His best known work is Orhipean, a didactic work on history, geography, customs, originally written in Euskera and later translated into Spanish, with two editions: From the Orhy. Know the country of Euskara (1996) and Orhypean. The country of Euskara (2005); To English, Orhypean. The Country of Basque (2006), to the French, Orhypean. Le pays de la langue basque (2010)  and Catalan, Orhypean. The country of the Basque region (2012)
In 2009, Basque was published : its language through history the Castilian version of Euskara Jendea , an approximation to the evolution of the language of the Basques throughout history.

Works 
Orhipean: Gure herria ezagutzen (Pamiela, 1992).
1898, Garralda (Pablo Mandazen Fundazioa, 1998).
Orekan: Herri eta Hizkuntzen ekologiaz (Pamiela, 2001).
Euskara jendea: Gure hizkuntzaren historia, gure historiaren hizkuntza (Pamiela, 2006).
Euskara Jendea: Gure hizkuntzaren historia, gure historiaren hizkuntza. Dokumentalak. 6 DVD. (Ibaizabal Mendebalde elkartea - Zenbat Gara elkartea, 2013).
Etxea. Ondarea, Historia, Mintzoa (Pamiela - Erroa, 2016).
Etxera bidean, Saio eta Testigantza (Pamiela, 2018).

References 

1956 births
Living people